Sarıcalar or Sardzhalar may refer to:

Sarıcalar, Saatly, is a village and municipality in the Saatly Rayon of Azerbaijan.
Sarıcalar, Göynük, is a village in the District of Göynük, Bolu Province, Turkey.
Sarıcalar, Sungurlu
Sardzhalar, is a town in the Ararat Province of Armenia.

See also
Sarıcalı (disambiguation)